La Compôte is a commune in the Savoie department in the Auvergne-Rhône-Alpes region in south-eastern France.

Geography
The village lies in the northern part of the commune, on the right bank of the Chéran, which flows northwestward through the northern part of the commune.

See also
Communes of the Savoie department

References

External links

Official site

Communes of Savoie